The 2002 Ms. Olympia contest 
is an IFBB professional bodybuilding competition and part of Joe Weider's Olympia Fitness & Performance Weekend 2002 was held on October 18, 2002, at the Mandalay Bay Arena in Paradise, Nevada. It was the 23rd Ms. Olympia competition held. Other events at the exhibition include the Mr. Olympia and Fitness Olympia contests.

Prize money

Results

Scorecard

Comparison to previous Olympia results:
+1 - Lenda Murray
-1 - Iris Kyle
-1 - Vickie Gates
-1 - Yaxeni Oriquen-Garcia
-2 - Dayana Cadeau
+4 - Nancy Lewis
+2 - Valentina Chepiga
+5 - Fannie Barrios
+4 - Angela Debatin
-3 - Laura Creavalle

Attended
13th Ms. Olympia attended - Laura Creavalle
9th Ms. Olympia attended - Lenda Murray
7th Ms. Olympia attended - Vickie Gates
6th Ms. Olympia attended - Juliette Bergmann
5th Ms. Olympia attended - Valentina Chepiga, Nancy Lewis, and Yaxeni Oriquen-Garcia
4th Ms. Olympia attended - Iris Kyle
3rd Ms. Olympia attended - Dayana Cadeau
2nd Ms. Olympia attended - Fannie Barrios and Angela DeBatin
1st Ms. Olympia attended - Sophie Duquette, Susanne Niederhauser, Beth Roberts, and Betty Viana
Previous year Olympia attendees who did not attend – Renee Casella, Kim Harris, Lesa Lewis, Gayle Moher, Betty Pariso, Brenda Raganot, and Joanna Thomas

Notable events
 Lenda Murray comes back after a four-year hiatus to win her 7th overall and heavyweight Ms. Olympia title, thus surpassing Cory Everson's six overall Olympia wins.  Juliette Bergmann wins her 2nd lightweight Ms. Olympia title.
 This was Laura Creavalle last Olympia before her retirement.

2002 Ms. Olympia Qualified

See also
 2002 Mr. Olympia

References

Ms Olympia, 2002
2002 in bodybuilding
Ms. Olympia
Ms. Olympia
History of female bodybuilding